Reach the Beach is the second studio album by English new wave band the Fixx, released on 13 May 1983 by MCA Records. It was the group's most successful studio album, reaching No. 8 on the Billboard albums chart and eventually selling two million copies in the United States alone. The album was certified Platinum by the RIAA. It was certified platinum in Canada in November 1983. The album's cover art was provided by George Underwood, who went on to illustrate future Fixx releases including Phantoms (1984), Calm Animals (1989), and Beautiful Friction (2012).

Reach the Beach contains their best-known and highest charting single, "One Thing Leads to Another", which reached No. 4 on the Billboard Hot 100.

Track listing

Personnel
Credits are adapted from the Reach the Beach liner notes.

Musicians
 Cy Curnin – vocals
 Rupert Greenall – keyboards
 Jamie West-Oram – guitar
 Adam Woods – percussion; drums
 Alfie Agius – bass on "One Thing Leads to Another", "Saved by Zero" and "Liner"
 Dan K. Brown – bass on "The Sign of Fire"

Agius left the Fixx partway through the recording sessions, and is not listed as an official group member in the album credits.

Brown played bass on one track, and on the subsequent tour; he would be promoted to full group-member status as of the band's next studio album, Phantoms (1984).

Production and artwork
 Rupert Hine – producer
 Stephen W Tayler – engineer; mixing
 George Underwood – front cover painting
 Trevor Toms – photography
 The Cream Group (Design Company from Amsterdam, the Netherlands) – mechanical artwork

Charts

Singles

References

External links
 

The Fixx albums
1983 albums
Albums produced by Rupert Hine
MCA Records albums